This is a list of electoral results for the Eastern Victoria Region in Victorian state elections from the region's creation in 2006 until the present.

Election results

Elections in the 2020s

2022

Elections in the 2010s

2018

2014

2010

Elections in the 2000s

2006

References

Victoria (Australia) state electoral results by region